Richard Patrick Smith, was an Irish born, Roman Catholic priest who served as Archbishop of Port of Spain, Trinidad.
He was born in the parish of Kilbride, Co. Cavan, Diocese of Meath, on (St. Patrick's Day) the 17th of March, 1802. Having received his early education in Balljonachugh, he entered Maynooth College to study for the priesthood, for the Ardagh Mission (despite Smith being from the Meath diocese), and was ordained in 1825. It was highlighted in the Maynooth Commission Report in 1855, that Dr Smith was technically an external student in Maynooth, attending lectures while residing in the town, since he was destined for foreign missions, this would seem to have contravened the British Government's, statutes for the college.
Shortly after ordination he decided to go on the Trinidad Mission, in preparation to preach the Gospel to the French Colonists, he went to France and entered Saint-Sulpice, Paris, where he remained for two years, mastering the French language, he arrived in Trinidad in 1827.

Appointed Coadjutor Vicar Apostolic, 1837, in 1844 he was appointed Bishop of Port of Spain serving until his death. He had guided the diocese from vicar apostolate to archdiocese, and the transition from slave labour to waged labour. 

Smith died May 6, 1852. He had not nominated a successor, which led to some controversies in the diocese.

References 

1802 births
1852 deaths
People from County Cavan
19th-century Irish bishops
Irish expatriate Catholic bishops
Alumni of St Patrick's College, Maynooth